Wiesbach is a river located in Bavaria, Germany. It flows into the Lech south of Landsberg am Lech.

See also
List of rivers of Bavaria

References

Rivers of Bavaria
Rivers of Germany